The City Stadium is a multi-purpose stadium in George Town, Penang, Malaysia, and serves as the home stadium of the Penang state football team, Penang FA. The oldest built stadium still in use in Malaysia, it was built in 1932 by the British government.

The stadium has a capacity of approximately 25,000 people and is now mainly used for football matches involving Penang FA, such as the Malaysian Super League. It is also well-known for the vociferous home support, dubbed the "Keramat Roar".

The stadium was the site where Mohd Faiz Subri, a Penang FA player, scored a physics-defying free kick goal during a Malaysian Super League match in 2016. He was awarded the prestigious FIFA Puskás Award the following year for this particular effort.

History

Penang Island National Stadium (1945–2003)
Construction of the City Stadium commenced on 1 October 1945, just after the end of the Second World War. Upon completion in 1948, it was officially named the Penang Island National Stadium.

The stadium was expanded by the British government in 1950 and underwent further renovation in 1953.

City Stadium (2003–present)
The Penang Island National Stadium was eventually renamed the City Stadium in 2003. Another round of renovation works was conducted in the 2000s.

However, as George Town had already been densely developed, under the confined urban constraints the City Stadium could not be expanded further. The Penang FA had briefly moved to the Penang State Stadium in Batu Kawan on the mainland due to capacity concerns, but in 2011, the state football team then returned to the City Stadium. The Penang FA has been playing major football matches at the City Stadium ever since.

At present, the stadium can accommodate about 25,000 people, although its main gate has been reduced in size.

Notable matches

Exhibition matches
On 14 May 1975, the second exhibition match was played between the Malaysia League XI and Arsenal Football Club. The match ended in a 1–1 draw for both sides.

The Penang FA also played an exhibition match against BSC Young Boys (Switzerland) which ended in a 1–1 draw on 25 January 1982. Before that, on 12 January 1982, FC Bayern Munich II played versus Penang, which ended in a 1–0 win for the home side.

FIFA Puskás Award

In 2017, a Penang FA player, Mohd Faiz Subri, made history as the first Asian to win the FIFA Puskás Award, an annual award given to the football player who was judged to have scored the best goal of the previous year. Mohd Faiz Subri won the award for his physics-defying free kick on 16 February 2016 during the Malaysian Super League match in the City Stadium between Penang and Pahang, which the home team won 4-1.

References

Football venues in Malaysia
Athletics (track and field) venues in Malaysia
Multi-purpose stadiums in Malaysia
Sports venues in Penang
Buildings and structures in George Town, Penang
Penang F.C.